Dragić Komadina (born 1962 in Zemun) is a retired Yugoslav football player.

Club career
Dragić Komadina played for several Yugoslav First League teams, most notably, Red Star Belgrade.

External sources
stats
list of players in 1987/88 season

Living people
1962 births
People from Zemun
Serbian footballers
Yugoslav footballers
Yugoslav First League players
Red Star Belgrade footballers
OFK Beograd players
FK Sutjeska Nikšić players
NK Olimpija Ljubljana (1945–2005) players
Association football forwards